Aljaž Bedene was the defending champion but failed to defend his title, losing to Marcel Granollers 1–6, 1–6 in the final.

Seeds

Draw

Finals

Top half

Bottom half

References
 Main Draw
 Qualifying Draw

Irving Tennis Classic - Singles